Olga Kolomiyets (born 25 September 1973) was a Ukrainian female volleyball player.

She was part of the Ukraine women's national volleyball team at the 1996 Summer Olympics, and the 1994 FIVB Women's World Championship. On club level she played with Olexandria Bila.

References

External links
 
 
 

1973 births
Living people
Ukrainian women's volleyball players
Olympic volleyball players of Ukraine
Volleyball players at the 1996 Summer Olympics
Sportspeople from Zaporizhzhia